Hellenization in the Byzantine Empire describes the spread and intensification of ancient Greek culture, religion and language in the Byzantine Empire. The theory of  Hellenization generally applies to the influence of foreign cultures subject to Greek influence or occupation, which includes the ethnic and cultural homogenisation which took place throughout the life of the Byzantine Empire (330-1453).

Naming
Whilst the noun 'Hellene' refers simply to what is ‘Greek’, Hellenization comes from the word Hellazein. This refers to the adoption of Greek identity, culture and language — “to speak Greek or identify with the Greeks”.

The Hellenistic period following the campaigns of Alexander the Great in the fourth century is widely associated with the term. However, the wider academic consensus acknowledges its central role in the formulation and transformation of the Byzantine Empire throughout the over one thousand years of its existence.

Background 

Following the division of the Empire by the Emperor Diocletian in 286, the Emperor Constantine the Great (324 to 337) conquered rivals to become Emperor of both Eastern and Western halves of the empire. This led to the moving of the Roman capital to the founded city of Constantinople in 330. Making significant changes to the Roman Empire, Constantine legalized Christianity and later converted himself — subsequently leading to a distinct Christian culture. This characterised the Byzantine Empire following the demise of the Western Roman Empire in 476.

Byzantines continued to identify as Roman, and the pronoun ‘Byzantine’ was not used from the beginning. The term is  an anachronism which developed in later times derived from the term ‘Byzantium’. This is also the Greek word for Constantinople, the empire’s capital. Despite these Roman Imperial roots, the geographically and largely  Hellenic Byzantine Empire witnessed multiple periods of Hellenization and a departure from its Latin associations from its founding in 330 to its fall in 1453.

Following periods of instability and division between East and West the Roman Senate sent the regalia of the Western Empire to Eastern Emperor Zeno in 476, acknowledging Constantinople as the sole seat of the Roman Empire and Roman Emperor. What followed was a gradually intensifying process of political, cultural and eventually linguistic Hellenization. Amongst other reforms, this notably led to introducing Greek as the Byzantine Empire's official language in 610 under the Emperor Heraclius’ (ruled from 610 to 641).

Hellenism and Christianity 
The impact of Christianity following its legitimisation as the official state religion of Rome under Constantine in the 4th century contributed key impacts for the empire and its Hellenistic character.

There were varying clashes between the two ideals — Hellenism and Christianity — which were often deemed ‘incompatible’.  As Byzantine historian Dvornik notes, the Hellenistic theory of Divine Kingship was reconciled with the Byzantine concept of a single Universal Ruler who “imitated” and personified the Divine Ruler in Heaven. A fusion of Hellenistic doctrines, occurred as to justify this incorporation of Hellenistic and often pagan-associated themes into the heavily Christian society. Such elements included the classical philosophers Plato, Philo and Greek Stoics. Lactanitus and Clement of Alexandria also served as key contributors to the theory, that was solidified and instituted by Byzantine Eusebius of Caes in a finalistic and concluding doctrine. This was consistently characterised through the assimilation of neoclassical and Christian themes into Byzantine artwork.

The widespread attempts to reconcile Hellenistic cultural outlets with Christianity were however often questioned and repelled in an outwardly devoutly Christian-dominated culture. The case of Byzantine monk and Hellenistic revivalist Michael Psellos raised serious questions concerning his religious beliefs and the suggestion of their incompatibility with his reverence for Hellenistic cultural egresses. For example, according to Byzantinist Anthony Kaldellis: "In 1054 he [Psellos] was accused by the future Patriarch John Xiphilinos, of forsaking Christ to follow Plato."

Byzantine Iconoclasm and 'Anti-Hellenizing' Period 717-802 

The clashing ideals due to the revival of Hellenistic artistic expressionism and Eastern Christianity was first seen under the Emperor Leo III who founded the Isaurian dynasty. Despite the growing cultural affinity with its classical Greek 'ancestry', such as the Greek language changes under Heraclius in the 7th century, the Byzantine Empire went through a period of Iconoclasm in-part marking a period of 'counter-Hellenization' during the 8th century. 

Its roots are generally traced to an Old Covenant interpretation of the Ten Commandments, clearly forbidding the worshipping or creation of "graven images". As Exodus 20:4 states:

“You shall not make for yourself an image in the form of anything in heaven above or on the earth beneath or in the waters below."

This first started with a ban on religious images beginning under Leo III and continuing under the reign of his successors. This involved the widespread burning and destruction of venerated images, particularly those both religious and neoclassical in nature (as pictured). Further included the persecution of those whom supported the veneration of images. The Pope in the Western Empire, however, remained supportive of the use of such images throughout the period, widening an already growing divergence between the Carolingian Western tradition and the Byzantine Empire furthered by the reduction of Byzantine political control over its territorial holdings in parts of Italy.

Despite this, various historiographical explanations have strived toward understanding why this Iconoclasm took hold. Such traditional explanations, including those of Arnold J. Toynbee, points to the Islamic culture's increasing dominance and influence in the region at the time. This increasing prestige of Caliphate success during the 7th century is seen to have motivated Christians in Byzantium to adopt the Islamic position which surrounds the rejecting and destroying of liturgical, pagan or other religious imagery, idolatry.

The Byzantine Renaissance 

The Byzantine Renaissance, also known as the Macedonian Renaissance, marked a philosophic, artistic and literary resurgence of Hellenistic classical culture occurring between the years 867 to 1056. This central cultural aspect of Hellenization in Byzantium spanned from artistic and architectural styles and mediums appropriated by the Byzantines from Hellenic antiquity, to the poetic, theatrical and historiographical modes of writing and expression associated with ancient Greek literature, idolism and philosophy. This includes the Neoclassical revivals of Psellos and his predilection for Plato and other pagan (often Neoplatonic) philosophers.

Cultural resurgence and growing neoclassical tradition 
Before the reforms under Heraclius in the 7th century, Latin was the imperial language of government, administration and law whilst Ancient Greek served as the language of its literature and culture.  Shortly following the anti-Hellenic and conservative Christian Iconoclasm of the previous dynasty, the ascent of Basil I marked the start of the Macedonian Dynasty in 867 and a rise of Neoclassical Byzantine Greek revival. Due to the rise of Imperial Byzantine power and successful military campaigns against Arab forces, a bolstering of the Empire's treasuries and an economic boom lead to greater cultural and artistic preoccupation and neoclassical sentiment.

In Historiography and Literature 
The resurgence of cultural Greek-identifying in the Byzantine Empire during the Byzantine Renaissance and its unprecedented enamour with classical Greece (Until the later Italian and Northern Renaissance’s) is made clear by the 15th century Byzantine scholar Apostolis:

". . . Did you understand therefore how great a difference there is between the Greek and the European [\'Vestern] fathers in theology and in the other branches of philosophy?  Who can be compared with Orpheus, Homer, and Stesichorus in poetry; who with Plotinus, Proclus, and Porphyry; with Arius, Origen, and Eusebius, men [i.e., heretics] who have split the seam of Christ's garment? Who can be compared with Cyril, Gregory, and Basil; who, in the field of grammar, can equal or approach Herodian, Apollonius, and Trypho…do you not understand that Athens alone of all Greece was able to give birth to more philosophers than all Italy had or has? Now, however, I admit, we are the remnants of the Greeks, a view with which you of course agree willingly."

The Alexiad: Anna Komnene 
This Hellenizing veneration of Classical Greek culture is clearly seen in Byzantine literature. This particularly includes the historical works of princess, physician and historian Anna Komnene of the Komnenos Dynasty of the 12th century. In her esteemed historical work recounting the Crusades of the 12th century which threatened Byzantium's lands in the East, The Alexiad utilises clear classical Greek styles of epic poetry and rhetoric, associated with Homer and a historiographical "empirical spirit" of historians such a Thucydides, striving to derive historical accounts from first hand experience. Modern scholarship has drawn causal links to Greek mythology's influences in her work. As historian Lenora Neville notes:

"...in its title, Alexiad, and frequent Homeric vocabulary and imagery, it brings the archaic epics to mind. The characterization of Alexios as a wily sea captain steering the empire through constant storms with guile and courage strongly recalls Odysseus. Both in its epic cast and in other factors discussed below...the Alexiad is hence an unusual work that defies the expectations of readers who anticipate another volume in the tradition of classicizing Greek prose historiography."

Originally written in Greek in the 12th century (1148) and initially edited in 1651, the Alexiad depicts the events of the Crusades against the grain of common forms of historiography during the period. Written from a first hand, personable perspective and voice, the Alexiad dramatically acknowledges feelings and opinions of the events in a style emblematic of Homer's Iliad and other classical Greek styles of expression.

Hellenizing impacts of Islamic expansion 
When in 395 the Roman Empire split into its Western and Eastern empires, Latin saw continued use in the Byzantine Empire to be used as the official language, the Byzantine Empire from its foundation preserving the many Graeco-Roman systems of law and governance.

Byzantium’s Hellenic cultural and geographical reality is reflected in that the Greek language was already widely spoken among the Eastern Mediterranean nations as the main trade language. However, in a continuation of the image of Roman Imperium and administration, Latin was the 'official language of the empire until the reign of Heraclius (reigned 610-641), even though he himself is widely believed to have come from a Latin-speaking background.  The Byzantines retained some knowledge and use of Latin for several hundred years after; however, this was under informal terms and was, by this time, essentially considered a 'foreign language'. Remnants of Latin remained within the technical vocabulary (particularly in the military and the law).

Change of Imperial Administrative Language from Latin to Greek 
The emergence of the Muslim Arabs of Arabia in the 640s was followed by the conquest of large swathes of the Byzantine Empire in its Southern and Latin-speaking provinces. This initial included those of Syria and Egypt to the Arab Caliphate.

The rapid territorial expansion of the Arab Muslims since their initial emergence from Arabia in the 630s was under the Rashidun and Umayyad caliphs, and continued into the 11th century. The following decades were marked by continued aggrandizements which claimed parts of Asia Minor, Armenia and the conquering of the Byzantine Exarchate of Africa. In the Western territories, such as the Latin speaking Balkans, barbarian invasions marked the further decline of the Byzantine Latin-speaking regions. The rapidly declining Latin territories in the face of Islamic expansion and growing schismatic relationship between the Latin Roman West and Greek-speaking Roman East would inevitably lead to a renewed embracement and identification with Hellenistic culture and language.

Further, at the height of before-mentioned Islamic acquisitions, the growing schismatic relationship between the Latin West and Greek East was marked by unprecedented anti-Latin sentiment in the 11th and 12th centuries. Intensifying hostility in the 12th century to Italian trade led to anti-Roman Catholic policies and marked a changing relationship with the Western Holy Roman Empire, ultimately leading to the replacement of Latin with Greek as Byzantium’s official Imperial administrative language. The zenith of this conflict and anti-Latinism is considered a byproduct of the process of Hellenisation taking place at the time, including the Byzantine Greek Renaissance, as seen in an event known as the Massacre of the Latins in April 1182.

Notes 

Ancient Greek culture
Byzantine culture
Cultural assimilation